January 11 - Eastern Orthodox liturgical calendar - January 13

All fixed commemorations below are observed on January 25 by Eastern Orthodox Churches on the Old Calendar.

For January 12th, Orthodox Churches on the Old Calendar commemorate the Saints listed on December 30.

Feasts
 Afterfeast of the Theophany of Our Lord and Savior Jesus Christ.

Saints
 Martyr Tatiana of Rome, and those who suffered with her (c. 222 - 235)
 Martyr Mertius of Mauretania (284-305)
 Martyr Philotheus of Antioch (c. 305)
 Martyr Peter Apselamus of Eleutheropolis in Palestine (309)  (see also January 13, and October 14)
 Venerable Eupraxia of Tabenna in Egypt (393)
 Saints Tygrius the Presbyter, and Eutropius the Lector, at Constantinople (c. 395 - 408)  (see also: June 16)
 Holy Eight Martyrs of Nicaea, by the sword.
 Virgin-Martyr Euthasia, by the sword.
 Venerable Elias the Wonderworker of Egypt, Desert Father (4th century)  (see also January 8)
 Venerable Theodora of Alexandria, instructress of nuns (5th century)

Pre-Schism Western saints
 Saint Arcadius of Mauretania, a prominent citizen of Caesarea in Mauretania Caesariensis, barbarously martyred under Maximianus Herculeus (c. 302)
 Martyrs Zoticus, Rogatus, Modestus, Casutlus, between forty and fifty soldiers, in Africa.
 Saint John of Ravenna (Giovanni I Angelopte), Bishop of Ravenna and Confessor (494)
 Saint Caesaria, the gifted sister of St Caesarius of Arles and Abbess of the convent founded there by her brother (c. 530)
 Saint Victorian of Asan, founder and abbot of the monastery of Asan (now called San Vitorián) (c. 560)
 Saint Probus, Bishop of Verona in Italy (c. 591)
 Saint Eilian of Rome (Eilian of Anglesey), (6th century)  (see also January 13)
 Saint Salvius (Sauve), Bishop of Amiens, his relics were enshrined in Montreuil in Picardy (c. 625)
 Saint Benedict Biscop, Abbot of Wearmouth and Confessor (690)

Post-Schism Orthodox saints
 Saint Sava I, Enlightener and first Archbishop of Serbia (1235) (see also: January 14 - Greek)
 Venerable Martinian of White Lake, Abbot (1483)
 Venerable Galacteon, disciple of St. Martinian of White Lake, Fool for Christ (1506) 
 Venerable Archimandrite Theodosius of Tisman and Sophroniev Monasteries, fellow-struggler of St. Paisius Velichkovsky (1802)
 Saint John of Tula, Fool-for-Christ (1850)

Other commemorations
 Synaxis of the Icon of the Most Holy Theotokos "The Milk-giver" (Panagia Galaktotrofoussa; Mlekopitatelnica).
 Synaxis of the Icon of the Most Holy Theotokos "Akathist".
 Synaxis of the Icon of the Most Holy Theotokos "Mesopantitissis" in Crete (Theotokos of Mesopantitissis).
 Icon of the Mother of God "Priestly" (Popskaya).
 Commemoration of the Church of St. Alexander, near the Church of the Holy Apostles, in Constantinople.

Icon gallery

Notes

References

Sources
 January 12/January 25. Orthodox Calendar (PRAVOSLAVIE.RU).
 January 25 / January 12. HOLY TRINITY RUSSIAN ORTHODOX CHURCH (A parish of the Patriarchate of Moscow).
 January 12. OCA - The Lives of the Saints.
 The Autonomous Orthodox Metropolia of Western Europe and the Americas (ROCOR). St. Hilarion Calendar of Saints for the year of our Lord 2004. St. Hilarion Press (Austin, TX). p. 7.
 January 12. Latin Saints of the Orthodox Patriarchate of Rome.
 The Roman Martyrology. Transl. by the Archbishop of Baltimore. Last Edition, According to the Copy Printed at Rome in 1914. Revised Edition, with the Imprimatur of His Eminence Cardinal Gibbons. Baltimore: John Murphy Company, 1916. pp. 12–13.
Greek Sources
 Great Synaxaristes:  12 ΙΑΝΟΥΑΡΙΟΥ. ΜΕΓΑΣ ΣΥΝΑΞΑΡΙΣΤΗΣ.
  Συναξαριστής. 12 Ιανουαρίου. ECCLESIA.GR. (H ΕΚΚΛΗΣΙΑ ΤΗΣ ΕΛΛΑΔΟΣ). 
Russian Sources
  25 января (12 января). Православная Энциклопедия под редакцией Патриарха Московского и всея Руси Кирилла (электронная версия). (Orthodox Encyclopedia - Pravenc.ru).
  12 января (ст.ст.) 25 января 2013 (нов. ст.). Русская Православная Церковь Отдел внешних церковных связей. (DECR).

January in the Eastern Orthodox calendar